Scuola Italiana Eugenio Montale is a private Italian international school in Morumbi, São Paulo.

Its educational stages are: Educação Infantil/Scuola dell´Infanzia (preschool), Ensino Fundamental I/Scuola Primaria (elementary school), Ensino Fundamental II/Scuola Sec. di I Grado (junior high school), and Ensino Médio/Liceo Scientifico (senior high school).

See also

 Italian Brazilian

References

External links
  Scuola Italiana Eugenio Montale
  Scuola Italiana Eugenio Montale

European-Brazilian culture in São Paulo
International schools in São Paulo
Italian international schools in Brazil